Kirsten Beckett (born March 5, 1996) is a South African artistic gymnast. She was part of the South African 2014 Commonwealth Games team.

References

1996 births
South African female artistic gymnasts
Living people
Sportspeople from Johannesburg
African Games gold medalists for South Africa
African Games medalists in gymnastics
African Games silver medalists for South Africa
Competitors at the 2015 African Games
Gymnasts at the 2014 Commonwealth Games
Commonwealth Games competitors for South Africa